Sukhavati (IAST: Sukhāvatī; "Blissful") is a pure land of Amitābha in Mahayana Buddhism. It is also called the Land of Bliss or Western Pure Land, and is the most well-known of Buddhist pure lands, due to the popularity of Pure Land Buddhism in East Asia.

Etymology and names
The word is the feminine form of sukhāvat ("full of joy; blissful"), 
from sukha ("delight, joy") and -vat ("full of").

Sukhavati is known by different names in other languages. East Asian names are based on Chinese translations, and longer names may consist of the words "Western", "Blissful" and "Pure Land" in various combinations. Some names and combinations are more popular in certain countries. Due to its importance, Sukhavati is often simply called "The Pure Land" without distinguishing it from other pure lands.

* Only common in Chinese.

Nine levels of birth

In the final part of the Amitāyurdhyāna Sūtra, Gautama Buddha discusses the nine levels into which those born into the pure land are categorized.

Buddhist funerals
In Tibetan Buddhism, the world of Sukhavati is invoked during Buddhist funerals as a favorable destination for the deceased. Such rituals are often accompanied with the tantric technique of phowa ("transference of consciousness") to the pure land of Amitābha, performed by a lama on the behalf of the departed. Halkias (2013:148) explains that
"Sukhavati features in funeral rites and scriptures dedicated to the ritual care of the dead ('das-mchod). The structure and performance of Tibetan death ceremonies varies according to a set sequence of events...For the duration of these rites, the consciousness of the dead is coaxed into increasing levels of clarity until the time for the ritual transference to Sukhavati."

 in Japanese Buddhism is the appearance of the Amida on a "purple" cloud (紫雲) at the time of one's death. The most popular belief is that the soul would then depart to the Western Paradise. A number of hanging scroll paintings depict the western paradise.

Namesakes
A number of temples are named after Sukhāvatī:
 Kek Lok Si, Malaysia
 Kek Look Seah, Malaysia
 Jile Temple, Harbin, China
 Shinshōgokuraku-ji, Kyoto, Japan

Gallery

See also 
 Sukhāvatīvyūha, two sūtras
 Naraka (concept of hell in Buddhism, Hinduism, Jainism, and Sikhism)

References

Further reading
 
 Tanaka, Kenneth K. (1987). Where is the Pure Land?: Controversy in Chinese Buddhism on the Nature of Pure Land, Pacific World Journal (New Series) 3, 36-45
 Halkias, Georgios (2013). Luminous Bliss: a Religious History of Pure Land Literature in Tibet. With an Annotated Translation and Critical Analysis of the Orgyen-ling golden short Sukhāvatīvyūha-sūtra. University of Hawai‘i Press. 
 Johnson, Peter, trans. (2020). The Land of Pure Bliss, Sukhāvatī: On the Nature of Faith & Practice in Greater Vehicle (Mahāyāna) Buddhism, Including The Scripture About Meditation on the Buddha ‘Of Infinite Life’ (Amitāyur Buddha Dhyāna Sūtra, 觀無量壽佛經)  and a full translation of Shandao's Commentary on it , An Lac Publications,

External links

 The Shorter Sukhāvatīvyūha Sūtra, the Amitabha Sutra
 Dol-po-pa’s: A Prayer for Birth in Sukhāvatī

 
Amitābha Buddha
Pure lands
Conceptions of heaven
Afterlife places